Michael Bublé Meets Madison Square Garden is the third live album released by Canadian singer Michael Bublé. The album features an Audio CD and Live DVD, in the fashion of all of Buble's live albums. The DVD follows the lead-up to what is described as one of the biggest shows of Bublé's career, to be performed at Madison Square Garden in New York City. Bublé visits the Blue Note Club, where he first performed in New York City over six years prior. There is also backstage footage at the Gardens, and footage of Bublé with his family. The DVD was directed and produced by Jason Hehir, on the documentary side, with concert footage directed by Dick Carruthers. The trailer premiered at Bublé's official website. The album released in two primary versions: the standard orange cover edition, and a blue-covered "fan" edition. The latter includes two bonus tracks on both the CD and DVD. The fan edition is not available in stores, and is only available from Bublé's website. It won a Grammy Award on 2010 for Best Traditional Pop Vocal Album At the 52nd Grammy Awards.

Track listing 
 Disc One (Audio CD)

 Disc Two (DVD)
The DVD features 90 minutes of live performances, backstage footage, and exclusive images. The Fan Edition includes performances of "Stardust" and "You're Nobody till Somebody Loves You".

Chart positions

Certifications

References

Michael Bublé live albums
2009 live albums
2009 video albums
Live video albums
Albums recorded at Madison Square Garden
Grammy Award for Best Traditional Pop Vocal Album
143 Records live albums